is a Japanese volleyball player who plays for Denso Airybees. She is also part of the Japan women's national volleyball team and played at the 2016 Summer Olympics in Rio de Janeiro. and at the 2020 Summer Olympics, in Women's volleyball,.

Career 
She participated at the 2016 FIVB World Grand Prix and 2018 FIVB Volleyball Women's Nations League.

References

External links
 Profile at FIVB.org

1991 births
Living people
Japanese women's volleyball players
Place of birth missing (living people)
Volleyball players at the 2014 Asian Games
Japan women's international volleyball players
Olympic volleyball players of Japan
Volleyball players at the 2016 Summer Olympics
Volleyball players at the 2020 Summer Olympics
Expatriate volleyball players in Romania
Japanese expatriate sportspeople in Romania
Asian Games competitors for Japan